Wassergass is an unincorporated community in Northampton County, Pennsylvania.  Wassergass is part of the Lehigh Valley metropolitan area, which had a population of 861,899 and was the 68th most populous metropolitan area in the U.S. as of the 2020 census.

History
The village was originally known as Ironville, which was changed to avoid confusion with Iron Hill, a former village on Hellertown Road outside Bethlehem. The name Wassergass, in use since the 1890s, is German for "water lane", which originated because of a nearby stream.
A post office was established in 1892 but remained in operation for only 12 years.

References

Unincorporated communities in Northampton County, Pennsylvania
Unincorporated communities in Pennsylvania